The 2020–21 Albanian Women's National Championship was the 12th season of the Albanian Women's National Championship, the top Albanian women's league for association football clubs, since its establishment in 2009. The season started on 7 November 2020 and ended on 23 May 2021.

League table

Results

References

External links
Official website

2020–21
2020–21 domestic women's association football leagues
Women's National Championship